Forsyth High School, or FHS, is a small rural high school located in Forsyth, Missouri, with an enrollment of about 411 students for the 2015-2016 school year.

Academics
In 2005 the FHS FFA Forestry team took first place in the nation.
In 2020 the FHS Forestry team took second place in the nation, with four members finishing individually in the top 20 and Nathaniel Guy finishing 2nd place individually.
In April 2007 the FHS Math Team ("Mathletes") took first place in the state for their division.

The FHS class of 2007 holds the distinction of having the most valedictorians in one year, 6 students.

FHS participates in the dual enrollment program through Missouri State University and Ozarks Technical Community College. Dual enrollment classes earn students high school and college credit simultaneously.  This program takes the place of other widely known programs such as International Baccalaureate and complements the Advanced Placement courses.

Athletics
The 2006-2007 girls tennis team made history when they advanced to the state final four, a first for any girls team in the school's history.

Forsyth has a deep tradition in athletics and has visited the final four multiple times in Boys Basketball and Baseball in 2000.  The school is a part of the Mid Lakes Conference and is a perennial contender in all conference competitions.

MCJROTC
Forsyth High has been classified as a Naval Honor School for over five years.

School Facts
 Colors: Blue, Black, and White (accent colors: gray and red)
 Mascot: Panther
 News Show: The Prowler, published weekly
 Yearbook: Duceretanco ("To Lead Taney County"), published annually
 School-wide clubs include Art Club, Book Club, FBLA, FCA/Y4C, FCCLA, FFA, Industrial Arts/Bin Art, Math Club, NHS, Prom Committee, Student Council, Spanish Club, and more.
 Rivalries: Hollister High School

References

Public high schools in Missouri
Schools in Taney County, Missouri